John Whittington may refer to: 

John Whittington (screenwriter), American screenwriter
John Whittington (cricketer) (1837–?), English cricketer

See also
Joan Whittington, English Red Cross aid worker